The Connecticut Governor's Residence serves as the official home of the governor of Connecticut. It is located at 990 Prospect Avenue in Hartford.

The Connecticut Governor's Residence has served as the official residence since 1945. The house was originally built in 1909 for George C. F. Williams, a Hartford physician and industrialist. It was designed in the Georgian Revival style by the Boston-based architectural firm of Andrews, Jaques & Rantoul and built at a cost of $337,000. In 1916, Hartford architects Smith & Bassette designed the north and south wing additions. The three-story home originally stood on  that included a grass tennis court, a greenhouse and a number of outbuildings. It remained in the Williams family until 1940. The property was acquired by the State of Connecticut in 1943.

The Governor's Mansion is a contributing building in the Prospect Avenue Historic District, which is listed on the National Register of Historic Places.

References

External links

 Official Site

Houses on the National Register of Historic Places in Connecticut
Governors' mansions in the United States
Governor's Residence
Government buildings in Connecticut
Georgian Revival architecture in Connecticut
Houses in Hartford, Connecticut
Historic district contributing properties in Connecticut
National Register of Historic Places in Hartford, Connecticut